Arthur Eckstein is an American historian and Distinguished professor of History at the University of Maryland-College Park, as well as a published author.

Bibliography
 Senate and General:  Individual Decision-Making and Roman Foreign Relations, 264-194 B.C. (1987)
 Mediterranean Anarchy, Interstate War, and the Rise of Rome. University of California Press, 2006.
 Rome Enters the Greek East: From Anarchy to Hierarchy in the Hellenistic Mediterranean, 230-188 B.C. (2008)
 Bad Moon Rising: How the Weather Underground Beat the FBI and Lost the Revolution. 2016.

References

University of Maryland, College Park alumni
21st-century American historians
American male non-fiction writers
Year of birth missing (living people)
Living people
University of Maryland, College Park faculty
21st-century American male writers